New Town is an unincorporated community in Gordon County, Georgia, United States, located northeast of Calhoun. New Town is near the New Echota historic site, which was formerly part of the Cherokee Nation. Ashworth Middle School and Gordon Central High School are located in the New Town community.

New Town is the English translation of the historic Cherokee name, Ꭴꮝꮤꮎꮅ Ustanali.

Geography
Alan Creek is a small stream located in New Town. It is a tributary of the Oostanaula River, part of the Coosa-Alabama-Mobile River watershed and is located near the New Echota Historic Site.

References

Unincorporated communities in Gordon County, Georgia
Unincorporated communities in Georgia (U.S. state)